Roy Jack Thornton (November 29, 1909 – November 4, 2002), born "Roy Lee Thornton", was an American Negro league first baseman in the 1930s.

A native of Athens, Georgia, Thornton attended Morris Brown College and Atlanta University. He played for the Atlanta Black Crackers in 1932 and again in 1937. Thornton died in Chicago, Illinois in 2002 at age 92.

References

External links
 and Seamheads

1909 births
2002 deaths
Atlanta Black Crackers players